New York Cake is a 1981 Italo disco album by Italian band Kano, recorded for Full Time Records and released in the United States by Mirage Records. It was produced by Luciano Ninzatti, Matteo Bonsanto, and Stefano Pulga. The album features Italian top 3 hit "Baby Not Tonight" and American No. 89 Hit "Can't Hold Back (Your Loving)".

The album  entered the Billboard 200 and Top R&B Albums charts in 1982.

In 2009 the British label, Funky Town Grooves, released the album in a limited edition for the first time on CD with an extended version of "Can't Hold Back (Your Loving)" as a bonus track. The album was taken from a vinyl LP not the master-tapes.

The song "Can't Hold Back (Your Loving)" was featured in the video game Grand Theft Auto V.

Track listing 
All songs written by L. Ninzatti, S. Pulga, Mammared, B. Addoms.

Personnel
Backing Vocals: Lella Esposito, Linda Wesley, Rossana Casale
Bass guitar: Dino D'Autorio
Bass guitar (tracks: A3, B3): Julius Farmer
Drum kit: Flaviano Cuffari
Drum kit: Tullio De Piscopo (tracks: A3, B3)
Electric guitar: Luciano Ninzatti
Keyboards: Stefano Pulga
Percussion: Maurizio Preti
Arrangement, songwriters: Luciano Ninzatti, Stefano Pulga

Production
Cover: Novella Massaro
Art direction: Michelangelo Farina
Executive producer: Luciano Ninzatti, Matteo Bonsanto, Stefano Pulga
Associate producer: Claudio Donato
Engineers: Bruno Malasoma, Luciano Ninzatti, Matteo Bonsanto, Stefano Pulga
Mixing: Bruno Malasoma

Charts

References

1981 albums
Kano (band) albums